HNLMS  Urania is a naval training ship of the Dutch Navy and is used to train future Adelborsten from the Royal Naval College.

History 
When the old  a hole punched in the hull she needed to be replaced. Due to budget cuts this wasn't an option so the navy opted for an extensive refit. During this refit it was uncovered that most of the ship was being held together with putty. Olivier F. van Meer was charged with the design of the new ship that had to resemble the old Urania at a distance. The keel was laid in 2003 at De Gier & Bezaan Int. in Enkhuizen and in the summer the hull was moved to Den Helder for fitting out by the navy.
Eventually she was launched on 18 May 2004, and commissioned a week later. Some parts of the old Urania were used in the construction of the new one. For example the old stern was fitted to the new ship but in the end was removed again in favor of a new stern. The only remaining bit from the old Uranina being the wheel.

See also

References 

Training ships of the Royal Netherlands Navy 
Sail training ships
Tall ships of the Netherlands
Two-masted ships
2004 ships
Individual sailing vessels